Dan Newberry is an American politician from the state of Oklahoma. A member of the Republican Party, he served in the Oklahoma Senate.

Political career 
Newberry was first elected to the Oklahoma Senate in 2008. In June 2017, Newberry announced that he would resign in January 2018 to accept a job in the private sector.

References

External links

Living people
Republican Party Oklahoma state senators
21st-century American politicians
Year of birth missing (living people)